Fabienne Aline St Louis (born 22 March 1988) is a Mauritian professional triathlete, the African U23 Vice Champion (2007, 2008, 2009, and 2010), Elite Vice Champion (2010), and U23 African Champion (2011).

St Louis qualified for the London Olympics 2012.  She competed at the 2014 Commonwealth Games. Despite being diagnosed with cancer in 2015, she qualified for the 2016 Summer Olympics.

Education 
Fabienne Saint-Louis attended the French school Lycée La Bourdonnais in her hometown Curepipe.
From 2007/08 to 2009/10, as with the French triathletes Laurent Vidal and David Hauss, she took part in an education programme in Paris arranged by the Jean-Luc Lagardère Foundation and the lifelong learning institution, Sciences Po. This programme is designed to meet the needs of high performance sports people.
Since 2010/11 Fabienne Saint-Louis has studied sports (STAPS).

French triathlons 
Within France, St Louis was primarily known for being the best elite triathlete of Lagardère Paris Racing for several years. She represented the club in the Championnat de France des clubs D2, winning, amongst other achievements, gold medals at St. Cyr (9 May 2009), Saint Jean de Monts (27 June 2009), and at the D2 finale in Betton (12 September 2009).

In 2009, St Louis also took part in two of the Everyman Olympic Distance competitions organized as part of the prestigious French Club Championship Series Lyonnaise des Eaux, winning the gold medal in Paris and placing fourth at the Grand Final in La Baule.

In addition to minor competitions like the Triathlon de Pont-Audemer (17 May 2009), the Triathlon International de Mimizan (30/31 May 2009), and the Triathlon International de Larmor-Plage (23 August 2009), which St Louis won easily, she also won the bronze medal at the French U23 Championships in Belfort on 6/7 June 2009, which, however, caused controversy in the French media because it was not clear whether, as a Mauritian citizen, she could be awarded the bronze medal at the French National Championships.

In 2011, for the first time, St Louis took part in the prestigious French Club Championship Series Lyonnaise des Eaux together with teammates Emmie Charayron and Rebecca Robisch. She won the first triathlon of this French circuit in Nice on 24 April 2011, placing 16th in the individual ranking.

ITU Competitions 
Since 2006, St Louis has continuously achieved medal positions at ITU events. The African Cups and Championships, however, can hardly be considered competitive.

From 2009 onwards, however, St Louis did take part successfully in competitive ITU events, namely the European U23 Championships (as a Mauritian citizen) and a World Cup, placing 13th in Tarzo Revine and 11th in Huatulco respectively. At the first ITU triathlon of the 2011 season, Saint Louis placed 12th in Quarteira.

In the five years from 2006 to 2011, Fabienne St Louis took part in 28 ITU competitions and achieved 14 top ten positions.
The following list is based upon the official ITU rankings and the athlete's Profile Page.
Unless indicated otherwise, the following events are triathlons (Olympic Distance) and belong to the Elite category.

Thanks to a New Flag spot, for which she was the sole contender, St Louis qualified for the London Olympics 2012 although she ranked only 80th in the 2012 ITU Point List / Women's Standing as of 27 May 2012.

In December 2015, St Louis was diagnosed with cancer but despite this she qualified for the 2016 Summer Olympics in Rio.

DNF = did not finish · DNS = did not start

References

External links
 
 St. Louis’ ITU Profile Page
 St. Louis’ French club in French

Mauritian female triathletes
1988 births
Living people
People from Plaines Wilhems District
Olympic triathletes of Mauritius
Triathletes at the 2012 Summer Olympics
Triathletes at the 2016 Summer Olympics
Triathletes at the 2014 Commonwealth Games
Commonwealth Games competitors for Mauritius
African Games bronze medalists for Mauritius
African Games medalists in triathlon
Competitors at the 2011 All-Africa Games